Boletopsis atrata is a species of hydnoid fungus in the family Bankeraceae. It was described as new to science in 1982 by Norwegian mycologist Leif Ryvarden. It has a disjunct distribution, found in temperate forests of East Asia and Eastern North America, where it fruits at the base of hardwood trees and stumps, especially oak (Quercus) and chestnuts (Castanea).

References

External links

Fungi described in 1982
Fungi of Asia
Fungi of North America
Thelephorales
Taxa named by Leif Ryvarden